"Tu vas me quitter" is a 1999 song recorded by French singer Hélène Ségara. It was the fourth single from her second studio album, Au Nom d'une Femme, and Ségara's 13th single overall. Released in January 2001, it achieved success, reaching the top ten in France and Belgium.

Background and lyrics
The song was written by Deck and Christian Loigerot, and the music was composed by T.Geoffroy, who had worked on many songs from the album Au Nom d'une Femme. The second track, "Mes Rêves disaient la vérité", is an unreleased song composed by Michel Jourdan and N.Kaniel. "Tu vas me quitter" deals about a loving break in which the narrator admits to have anticipated the end of this relation and to be unhappy because of this.

Live versions
The song is also available on the live album En concert à l'Olympia, but in Spanish-language, under the title "Me vas a dejar". Lyrics in this version were written by the French singer and songwriter Nilda Fernandez. "Tu vas me quitter" also features on Ségara's greatest hits album Le Best of.

Chart performances
In France, "Tu vas me quitter" debuted at number 23 on 3 February 2001, then climbed to number seven, then almost always dropped on the chart, and totaled four weeks in the top ten, 15 weeks in the top 50 and 20 weeks in the top 100. It achieved Silver status awarded by the SNEP and was ranked at number 56 on the Annual Chart.

"Tu was me quitter" went to number 37 on 10 February on the Belgian chart, then jumped to number 14 and hit number 10 three weeks later. It stayed there for two consecutive weeks, then dropped and fell off the chart after 13 weeks. It was the 66th best-selling single of 2001.

Track listings
 CD single

 Digital download

Personnel
 Lyrics and music: L.Deck, C.Loigerot and T.Geoffroy
 Programmation, conductor, keyboards: Sandro Abaldonato
 Guitar: Serge Eymar
 Mixing: Thierry Rogen, Studio Mega / Grégoire Noteris, Studio SBG
 Artistic director: Antoine Angelelli
 Production: Orlando for B.G.
 Photos: Franck Camhi - Jet Set, Denis Taranto
 Cover: Barejo
 Editions: Bambino

Charts and sales

Peak positions

Year-end charts

Certifications and sales

References

External links
 "Tu vas me quitter", lyrics + music video

1999 songs
2001 singles
Hélène Ségara songs
Pop ballads